Jürgen "Jürg" Dick (born 2 May 1963 in Solothurn) is a former Swiss curler. He played third position on the Swiss rink that won a gold medal at the 1992 Winter Olympics when curling was a demonstration sport. Later that year, he won a bronze medal at his first appearance at the 1992 European Curling Championships. He is also a two-time Swiss junior curling champion curler (1980, 1981).

From 2012 to 2015 Jürgen Dick was a president of Curling Club Solothurn-Wengi, in 2014 he became an honorary member of the club.

Teams

Men's

Private life
His older brother Urs Dick is also a curler and Jürgen's teammate in 1992 Olympic team.

References

External links

Living people
1963 births
Swiss male curlers
People from Solothurn
Curlers at the 1992 Winter Olympics
Olympic curlers of Switzerland

Sportspeople from the canton of Solothurn
20th-century Swiss people